Second Lieutenant Puneet Nath Datt, AC (29 April 197320 July 1997) was an officer of the Indian Army's 11 Gorkha Rifles. He was posthumously awarded India's highest peace-time gallantry award, the Ashok Chakra, for bravery displayed in an Indian Army operation. The operation was conducted against terrorists hidden in a three-story building in the Naushera area of Srinagar, Jammu and Kashmir.

Early life 

Puneet Nath Datt was born on 29 April 1973, in Jodhpur, Rajasthan. He completed his schooling at St. Bethany's School in Darjeeling, St Joseph's Academy in Dehradun, St. Xavier's School Jaipur, and attained his class XII from Tagore Public School in Jaipur. He took keen interest in sports and extra-curricular activities, and particularly excelled in football and rowing. 

As a child, his ambition was to join the Indian Army. He mixed freely with the Gorkha jawans of his father's unit, and could speak fluent Gorkhali. He was dearly loved by the 'Dajus' or jawans - terms which meant elder brother, as he addressed them, while they called him their favourite 'naani', meaning little one. 

While still in High School, Puneet Nath Datta diverted his full attention towards his goal in life which remained joining the Indian Army, by preparing for entry in the renowned National Defence Academy. He secured entry in the NDA in December 1991. At the NDA, he had a brilliant record and due to his proficiency in both academic & military subjects as well as outstanding officer like qualities, he was awarded the coveted rank of 'Cadet Sergeant Major' for his 'Echo' squadron. As a Cadet Sergent Major, he won the prized Cross Country Shield for his squadron. He was also awarded three gold medals in rowing. Puneet was determined to join his father's regiment throughout his stay at the NDA. He used to proudly display on his study table the Gorkha crest, always polished. Whenever he met a Gorkha officer, he used to write back home that his spirits soared . Regimental to the core, he used to make it a point. He used to go out of the way to meet any serving or retired Gorkha officer.

Family 
His father's name was Major Pramod Nath Datt who also served in the Gorkha Rifles. For this reason Datt was inspired to join the same regiment. His grandfather's name was Colonel S.N.C Bakshi who also served in the Indian Army. While his uncle V. K. C. Bakhshi was a Commander in the Indian Navy. He was posthumously awarded Ashok Chakra which was received on his behalf by his mother, Anita Datt from the President of India on 26 January 1998, India's Republic Day.

Military career 
Puneet Nath Datta was commissioned in 1/11 Gorkha Rifles on 9 December 1995. He achieved the supreme aim of his life of serving his motherland, when he took part in an encounter that panned out as a cordon & search operation on specific information from a source cultivated by him regarding presence of foreign militants in a building in the Naushera locality of Srinagar. The operation was started on 20 July 1997.The building was completely surrounded by 0400 hours. The militants were secure within the three storied building located in a thickly populated and congested area. At daybreak when the terrorists found that they were surrounded, instead of surrendering to the Indian Army, they resorted to indiscriminate firing. Utmost restraint had to be exercised while trying to liquidate the onslaught so as to avoid any damage to innocent civilian life and property in the vicinity of the building. One militant visualizing the hopeless situation ran out firing on the search party. Seeing the militant firing on his troops, he ordered his troops to take cover and with utter disregard to personal safety sprang up and shot the militant in an eye-to-eye encounter. Meanwhile, sensing that the militants were trying to escape, he showed exemplary presence of mind & initiative and maneuvered his position to block the rear exit of the building. Displaying indomitable courage and guts, he shot down another militant who was trying to escape. The remaining militants inside the building meanwhile continued firing on our troops and as a result of which he was seriously wounded. But he did not give in and maintained his sustained crusade against foreign mercenaries and taking courage in both hands, lobbed a grenade inside the building, killing the remaining militants and destroying a considerable amount of the enemy's arms & ammunition. Hr almost single-handedly destroying the enemy, our hero attained martyrdom and immortalized himself by carving a niche in the annals of his Regiment and the Indian Army's history. For his bravery and in recognition of the initiative and dare devil displayed in the pursuit of his mission to eliminate militancy from the face of his motherland.

Ashok Chakra awardee 
For his raw courage, extraordinary bravery, leadership and in recognition of the initiative and dare devilry displayed in the pursuit of his mission to eliminate militancy from the face of his motherland,  Second Lieutenant Puneet Nath Datt was posthumously awarded the Ashoka Chakra, the India's highest peace time gallantry award on 15 August 1997.

References

Recipients of the Ashoka Chakra (military decoration)
1973 births
1997 deaths
Indian Army officers
Indian military personnel killed in action